The 2016–17 Toto Cup Leumit was the 27th season of the second tier League Cup (as a separate competition) since its introduction. It was held in two stages. First, sixteen Liga Leumit teams were divided into four regionalized groups, with the winners and runners-up advanced to the quarter-finals. Quarter-finals, semi-finals and the final were held as one-legged matches.

The defending cup holders were Hapoel Ashkelon, having won the cup on its previous edition.

In the final, played on 30 November 2016, Maccabi Sha'arayim defeated Hapoel Ramat Gan 2–1.

Group stage
Groups were allocated according to geographic distribution of the clubs. The groups were announced by the IFA on took place on 18 July 2016.

The matches are due to be played from 1 August.

Tiebreakers
If two or more teams are equal on points on completion of the group matches, the following criteria are applied to determine the rankings.
 Superior goal difference
 Higher number of victories achieved
 Higher number of goals scored
 Higher number of points obtained in the group matches played among the teams in question
 Superior goal difference from the group matches played among the teams in question
 Higher number of victories achieved in the group matches played among the teams in question
 Higher number of goals scored in the group matches played among the teams in question
 A deciding match, if needed to set which team qualifies to the quarter-finals.

Group A

Group B

Group C

Group D

Knockout rounds

Quarterfinals

Semifinals

Final

See also
 2016–17 Toto Cup Al
 2016–17 Liga Leumit
 2016–17 Israel State Cup

References

External links
 Official website 

Leumit
Toto Cup Leumit
Toto Cup Leumit